Brendan O'Meara is an Australian former professional rugby league footballer who played in the 1990s and 2000s. He played for the Illawarra Steelers and the South Sydney Rabbitohs in the New South Wales Rugby League (NSWRL) competition and the ARL and NRL competitions. O'Meara also played for the Dewsbury Rams, Rochdale Hornets and Featherstone Rovers in England.

Playing career
O'Meara made his first grade debut for Illawarra against South Sydney in Round 2 1991 at the Sydney Football Stadium.  The following year, O'Meara played 10 games but missed out on the club's historic finals appearance as they made it to within one game of the grand final itself.  

O'Meara would go on to be a regular member of the Illawarra team until the end of 1996 but the club struggled on the field and didn't make the finals from 1992 onwards.

In 1997, O'Meara joined South Sydney.  O'Meara spent 2 seasons at the club which were largely unsuccessful which the team finishing second last in 1997 and third last in 1998.

In 1999, O'Meara signed with English side Dewsbury.  O'Meara then went on to have spells with Rochdale and Featherstone before retiring at the end of 2003.

Post playing
After retiring from playing, O'Meara became a personal trainer.

References

1972 births
Living people
Illawarra Steelers players
South Sydney Rabbitohs players
Dewsbury Rams players
Featherstone Rovers players
Rochdale Hornets players
Australian rugby league players
Rugby league players from Wollongong
Rugby league wingers
Rugby league fullbacks